Luisita "Luchi" Cruz-Valdes (born December 27, 1965) is a Filipino broadcast journalist formerly affiliated with GMA News and Public Affairs and ABS-CBN News and Current Affairs. She is currently the chief of News5, the news and public affairs department of TV5.

Life and career

Cruz-Valdes earned her degree in broadcast communication at the University of the Philippines Diliman (UP), and became a radio and television reporter and producer. She is married to Lito Valdes, an IT marketing manager, and has three children.

Cruz-Valdes joined the Associated Broadcasting Company (ABC) as a field reporter when it set up a Manila bureau for the 1986 Snap Presidential Election. After her ABC stint, Cruz-Valdes was hired by Cheche Lazaro when ABS-CBN reopened after president Corazon Aquino was sworn into position.

For 10 years, she was a co-host of The Probe Team with Lazaro, founder and producer of the program, and also Cruz-Valdes' professor in UP. She proceeded to become part of the GMA News and Public Affairs for three years before accepting the offer of rival network ABS-CBN to become its vice president for news production and current affairs in 2001.

Soon after leaving her post in GMA 7, the network filed cases of breach of contract and injunction against Cruz-Valdes, which prevented her from working in ABS-CBN from December 28, 2001, to August 20, 2002. In July 2008, the Quezon City Regional Trial Court judge Tita Marilyn Villordon dismissed the cases and ordered GMA Network to pay its former employee in damages equivalent to the salary that Cruz-Valdes should have earned during her eight-month "forced" vacation.

Also in 2008, Cruz-Valdes was placed under preventive suspension pending the outcome of an internal matter, which ABS-CBN Corporate Communications head Bong Osorio described as "not merely a petty personal difference or simple administrative concern."

In November of the same year, Cruz-Valdes filed her resignation. In 2010, she joined TV5 as its news chief.

One of her notable roles in joining TV5 is moderating the 2nd leg of PiliPinas Debates 2016.

Filmography

Television

Radio

Awards and Recognitions
 Catholic Mass Media Awards
 Titus Brandsma Award for Excellence in Journalism

 KBP Golden Dove (Kapisanan ng mga Brodkaster sa Pilipinas)
 Broadcaster of the Year (2001)
 Best Female Newscaster (2015)
 Ka Doroy Broadcaster of the Year Award (2015)

 New York Film and Television Festival
 3 Silver and 3 Bronze Medals for Best Documentary

 Inding-Indie Short Film Festival
 Most Outstanding Broadcaster Asian Media Award (2015)
 Pinakamapanuri at Pinagkakatiwalaang Brodkaster of the Year Award (2016)

References

1965 births
Living people
Filipino radio journalists
Filipino television journalists
RPN News and Public Affairs people
ABS-CBN personalities
ABS-CBN News and Current Affairs people
GMA Network personalities
GMA Integrated News and Public Affairs people
TV5 (Philippine TV network) personalities
TV5 Network executives
News5 people